Catholic Christian Outreach Canada (CCO) is a Catholic missionary organization that is present at several Canadian universities. It seeks to bring students into a personal relationship with Jesus Christ, equip them to live in the fullness of the Catholic faith, and build them up as leaders in evangelization. 

CCO's Mission statement: "...a university student movement dedicated to evangelization. We challenge students to live in the fullness of the Catholic faith with a strong emphasis on becoming leaders in the renewal of the world."

History
CCO was founded in 1988 by André and Angèle Regnier at the University of Saskatchewan. The Regniers had participated in Evangelical activities with Campus Crusade for Christ at the University of Saskatchewan and were inspired by the zeal and devotion they found there, and they wanted to see a similar zeal within the Catholic Church. They found this zeal in the Catholic Charismatic Renewal, whose spiritual disposition they adopted in their approach to evangelization. They collaborated with their parish priest to develop CCO as a faith outreach program to bring this approach to Catholic university students, helping them to grow in their faith and learn to share it with others.

In 1992 CCO became an incorporated non-profit organization with its headquarters in Saskatoon; its headquarters moved to Ottawa in 2006.

Current campuses
CCO began with four missionaries at the University of Saskatchewan.  it had expanded to over 126 staff at headquarters and sixteen universities and has plans to expand by 20 campuses between 2008 and 2028.

British Columbia

Alberta

Saskatchewan

Manitoba

Ontario

Quebec

Nova Scotia

Newfoundland and Labrador

Former campuses

Methods and materials
Students involved with CCO lead and attend weekly faith studies on campus. These faith studies help students learn more about their faith and how they can live it out. The material references Scripture verses from the Bible, the Catechism of the Catholic Church, and other Christian writings. They also employ analogies, useful in sharing spiritual realities in common terms. The studies are intended to fuel discussion in a comfortable, small group setting. The five studies are called Discovery, Source, Growth, Trust, and Commission.

Another method of evangelism used by CCO is on-campus events for large groups of students. One-on-one ministry training and leadership opportunities are available. Students attend retreats, recreational events, and other social and prayer related activities as well.

CCO has created a booklet entitled The Ultimate Relationship which serves as an introduction to basic Christian faith. This booklet has been translated into over a dozen languages, and one million copies were printed and distributed at World Youth Day 2016 in Kraków, Poland.

Rise Up 

CCO organizes an annual Christmas conference called "Rise Up". It is the second-largest Catholic conference for youth in Canada (behind Steubenville Toronto), and drew 850 participants to the 2013 conference in Ottawa.

Rise Up takes place every year from December 28 to January 1. It includes presentations, workshops, live worship, adoration, reconciliation, and a New Year's banquet and dance. It is designed to deepen students' spiritual life and to motivate them to share their faith with others.

Mission projects

CCO has facilitated several domestic and overseas missions throughout its existence, and has attended several World Youth Days.

IMPACT Canada
The annual IMPACT mission consists of students from across Canada gathering in one city for a summer of missionary work. Participants live in community and are assigned to teams at various parishes, where they lead faith studies and organize retreats and special events. Impact also features a weekly event called Cornerstone that involves skits, worship, testimonies, and Catholic teaching, a Courageous Catholic program that teaches people how to share their faith, and a monthly Summit event involving worship, Eucharistic adoration, and Reconciliation.

Other missions
Every Spring and Summer, CCO missionaries lead teams of students on foreign or domestic missions. The purpose of these trips is to help share the gospel in other areas, equip the locals on how to share their faith, and to build up the student participants in their confidence and love for Jesus.

Mission locations

See also
 Fellowship of Catholic University Students
 Saint Paul's Outreach

References

External links
 Official website

Christian organizations established in 1988
Catholic organizations established in the 20th century
Christian organizations established in the 20th century
Student religious organizations in Canada
Catholic youth organizations
Catholic missions
Catholic student organizations